Bervoets is a Belgian surname. Notable people with the surname include: 

Christiane Bervoets (born 1948), Belgian singer
Gene Bervoets (born 1956), Belgian actor
Marguerite Bervoets (1914–1944), Belgian resistance fighter
Marnicq Bervoets (born 1969), Belgian motocross racer